Centre Hospitalier de Luxembourg, abbreviated to CHL, is the public healthcare provider in Luxembourg City, in southern Luxembourg.

CHL's main site is located in the south-east of the quarter of Rollingergrund-North Belair, just to the north of Route d'Arlon, and to the west of the city centre.  On this site are three of CHL's four institutions:

 Municipal Hospital, a general hospital
 Grand Duchess Charlotte Maternity Hospital, a maternity hospital
 A pediatric clinic

In addition, since 3 October 2003, a general clinic in Eich has also been part of the organisation.

External links
 Centre Hospitalier de Luxembourg official website

References

Hospitals in Luxembourg
Government-owned companies of Luxembourg
Companies based in Luxembourg City
Hospitals established in 1975